|}

The Great Metropolitan Handicap is a flat handicap horse race in Great Britain open to horses aged four years or older. It is run over a distance of 1 mile 4 furlongs and 6 yards (2,420 metres) at Epsom in April during the Epsom Spring meeting. Inaugurated in 1846 it originally attracted top-class racehorses in the 19th and early 20th century, but today its importance has been eclipsed by larger stakes races with more valuable purses.

History 
The race was created through the efforts of pub landlord, Samuel Powell Beeton in response to a call for support from the Clerk of the Course at Epsom, who wanted to upgrade the Epsom Spring Meeting. Beeton ran The Dolphin pub, near to St Mary-le-Bow church in London, an establishment so well known as a betting premises, it became known as 'the Tattersalls of the East End'. Together with fellow licensees and bookmakers, he raised a collection of £300 to sponsor the race, which for its first year attracted a field of 29 runners. It thus became one of the first horse races in Britain to be sponsored. For this reason, it was, in its early years, referred to as The Publican's Derby. The race proved so successful that more landlords were brought on board to set up another race shortly afterwards - the City and Suburban Handicap.

For more than a century of its existence, the Great Metropolitan was a unique race. It was run over its own two and a quarter mile course, starting at the winning post, running back down the track for three furlongs, turning right across the in-field before rejoining the main course a mile from home. The in-field at Epsom, however, was open to the public, making it difficult to maintain in racing condition. In 1985 legislation was passed allowing the racecourse to fence off part of Epsom Downs and charge for public admission to the in-field. Consequently the race was reduced to a mile and a half and run over the main Derby course. In contrast to its early days, it is now a fairly typical middle ranking, middle distance handicap.

The first occasion that a photo-finish camera was used to decide a result at a British racecourse was for the 1947 Great Metropolitan, run on 22 April 1947, when second place was determined by the camera.

In 1891, a race in United States adopted the same name. Nowadays, the American Metropolitan Handicap, which since 1904, with a few exceptions, has been run at Belmont Park, far eclipses its British counterpart. It is a Grade 1 race which in 2012 was won by Preakness Stakes winner, Shackleford.

Winners since 1988

See also 
 Horse racing in Great Britain
 List of British flat horse races

References

 Paris-Turf:

Racing Post

Bibliography

External links 
 1949 Great Metropolitan Handicap on British Pathe newsreel
 Galopp-Sieger: Great Metropolitan

Epsom Downs Racecourse
Flat races in Great Britain
Open middle distance horse races
Recurring sporting events established in 1846
1846 establishments in England